Unity Trust Bank plc provides specialist banking services to trade unions, charities and other organisations that operate in the not-for-profit sector in the United Kingdom and, since December 2015, its remit has expanded to include profit-with-purpose businesses. Founded in 1984; head office is located at Four Brindleyplace, Birmingham.

History
Originally a licensed deposit taking institution, Unity Trust Limited acquired full status as a bank in 1987.

Ownership
Historically, Unity Trust Bank was majority owned by individual trade unions and federations (73.23%) and The Co-operative Bank owned the remainder (26.7%) through its subsidiary, Co-operative Commercial Limited. In December 2015, Unity bought back shares from Co-operative Commercial Limited, which reduced The Co-operative Bank's holding to 6.7%.

Unity Trust's new articles of association redesignated all shares into a single class, all ranking pari passu, and removed the different rights of the old classes and created additional shares. As a result, new shareholders have invested in Unity Trust and the Co-operative Bank no longer has a controlling interest or the right to appoint directors.

The Co-operative Bank's stake was put up for sale in early 2014 in an attempt to restore profitability following a capital shortfall, which resulted in a rescue by its bond holders – led by US hedge funds – and the parent Co-operative Group ceding control.

Activities
In its founding principles, the bank was established as “an organisation identified with and embracing the philosophy of the common good.” It promotes a socially responsible and sustainable approach to banking and lending. Unity Trust Bank was rated top in eight out of nine customer satisfaction categories in the Charity Finance Banking Survey 2015. In 2013, it became the first British bank to be awarded the Living Wage Employer Accreditation Mark.

The Co-operative Bank acted as the bank's clearing agent until 2015, when it migrated to a NatWest sort code.

See also

Trade unions in the United Kingdom
Credit unions in the United Kingdom
Social economy

References

External links
 
Trades Union Congress

Banks of the United Kingdom
Banks established in 1984
Companies based in Birmingham, West Midlands
Labour movement in the United Kingdom
Social enterprises
Ethical banking